One Big Union may refer to:

 One Big Union (concept), a concept that all workers should be organised in one union

 One Big Union (Canada), a trade union in Canada
 The One Big Union Monthly, a publication produced by the Industrial Workers of the World

 One Big Union: Judi Bari’s Vision of Green-Worker Alliances in Redwood Country, a book by Steve Ongerth about activist Judi Bari